La Verde (possibly ) is an Italian river whose source is on Montalto in the Aspromonte National Park, in Calabria, southern Italy. From there, the river flows southeast and then flows east before emptying into the Ionian Sea north of Cape Bruzzano.

References

Drainage basins of the Ionian Sea
Rivers of the Province of Reggio Calabria
Rivers of Italy